Robert William Hamilton (March 24, 1899 – August 9, 1981) was a justice of the Supreme Court of Texas from January 1, 1959 to December 31, 1970.

References

Justices of the Texas Supreme Court
1899 births
1981 deaths
20th-century American judges